Dick Barton at Bay is a 1950 British spy film about special agent Dick Barton. It was the second of three films that Hammer Film Productions made about the British agent, although it was the last released, following Dick Barton: Special Agent and Dick Barton Strikes Back.

Plot
Captain Richard 'Dick' Barton and his wartime college 'Snowey' White, are quickly assigned to recover a kidnapped scientist and de-activate a death ray before national catastrophe triggers World War III with Britain at the heart of Hell.

Cast

Main cast
 Don Stannard as Dick Barton
 Tamara Desni as Anna
 George Ford as Snowey White
 Meinhart Maur as Serge Volkoff
 Joyce Linden as Mary Mitchell
 Percy Walsh as Professor Mitchell
 Campbell Singer as Sir George Cavendish
 John Arnatt as Jackson
 Richard George as Inspector Slade
 Beatrice Kane as Betsy Horrock

Supporting cast
 Patrick Macnee as Phillips (Credited as Patrick McNee)
 George Crawford as Boris
 Paddy Ryan as Fingers
 Fred Owens as Gangster (credited as Fred Owen)
 Yoshihide Yanai as Chang
 Ted Butterfield as Tommy

Uncredited/cameo cast
 Arthur Howard as Extra
 Eliot Makeham as Police Sergeant
 Jim O'Brady as Henchman
 Ross Parker as Stall Holder
 Ben Williams as Submarine Captain Korczanski

Production
The film's title during production was Dick Barton vs the Death Ray. A fourth Barton film was scheduled, Dick Barton in Africa, but Don Stannard was killed in a car crash driving back from the wrap party and Hammer elected not to continue the series.

Critical reception
Sky Cinema wrote: "In their rush to get Barton on to the screen, the makers, despite using the original radio serials as a basis, neglected to give the films the proper budget, resulting in Dick's adventures having an air of tatty, thick-ear melodrama which was never present for the millions of wireless devotees glued to their sets every night at 6.45pm". TV Guide noted "a simple action-adventure film that moves at an entertaining pace". Allmovie called it "a far better thriller than its predecessor".

References

External links
 

1950 films
1950s spy films
British spy films
Films directed by Godfrey Grayson
Films based on radio series
British sequel films
Hammer Film Productions films
British black-and-white films
1950s English-language films
1950s British films